Cole Kelley (born October 27, 1997) is an American football quarterback for the Memphis Showboats of the United States Football League (USFL). He played college football at Arkansas and Southeastern Louisiana. Kelley signed with the Washington Commanders as an undrafted free agent in 2022 but was released prior to the season.

College career
Kelley played football and basketball at Teurlings Catholic High School in Lafayette, Louisiana. He joined the University of Arkansas as a four-star recruit in 2016. He started four games as a redshirt freshman in 2017 and two games the following year before transferring to Southeastern Louisiana University in 2019.

Kelley won the Walter Payton Award for the 2020–21 FCS season, given to the top offensive player in the NCAA Division I Football Championship Subdivision (FCS). He received first-team All-American FCS honors in both 2020 and 2021. He was invited to the January 2022 edition of the NFLPA Collegiate Bowl, and was named the game MVP.

Professional career

Washington Commanders
Kelley signed with the Washington Commanders as an undrafted free agent on May 2, 2022, but was released on August 7, 2022.

Memphis Showboats
On January 28, 2023, Kelley signed with the Memphis Showboats of the United States Football League (USFL).

References

External links 
 
 Southeastern Louisiana Lions profile
 Arkansas Razorbacks profile

1997 births
Living people
Sportspeople from Lafayette, Louisiana
Players of American football from Louisiana
American football quarterbacks
Arkansas Razorbacks football players
Southeastern Louisiana Lions football players
Washington Commanders players
Memphis Showboats (2022) players